Henry William Norton Pinniger (3 August 1872 – 6 January 1953) was an Australian rules footballer who played with St Kilda in the Victorian Football League (VFL).

References

External links 

1872 births
1953 deaths
Australian rules footballers from Victoria (Australia)
St Kilda Football Club players